David Blitz has been a faculty member at Central Connecticut State University since 1989. His areas of teaching and research are the history and philosophy of science, with special interest in theories of evolution and modern logic, as well as the work of Charles Darwin and Bertrand Russell. His book, Emergent Evolution: Qualitative Novelty and the Levels of Reality was published in 1992 by Kluwer Academic Publishers. He is currently working on a monograph on Bertrand Russell's Philosophy of War and Peace. David Blitz is also active in the Honors program and Peace Studies program.

Further reading
 Blitz, David: 1992, Emergent Evolution: Qualitative Novelty and the Levels of Reality, New York: Kluwer Academic Publishers.

References

External links
 Davit Blitz's home page at Central Connecticut State University
 Central Connecticut State University Philosophy Department
 Central Connecticut State University Honors Program
 Central Connecticut State University Peace Studies Program

American logicians
Anglophone Quebec people
Central Connecticut State University faculty
Academics from Montreal
Year of birth missing (living people)
Living people
Canadian expatriate academics in the United States